WinUSB is a generic USB driver provided by Microsoft, for their operating systems starting with Windows Vista but which is also available for Windows XP. It is aimed at simple devices that are accessed by only one application at a time (for example instruments like weather stations, devices that only need a diagnostic connection or for firmware upgrades). It enables the application to directly access the device through a simple software library. The library provides access to the pipes of the device. WinUSB exposes a client API that enables developers to work with USB devices from user-mode. Starting with Windows 7, USB MTP devices use WinUSB instead of the kernel mode filter driver.

Advantages and disadvantages

Advantages 
 Doesn't require the knowledge to write a driver
 Speeds up development

Disadvantages 
 Only one application can access the device at a time
 Doesn't support isochronous transfers prior to Windows 8.1
 Doesn't support USB Reset (as requested by DFU protocol for example)
 On other operating systems, the device still needs a custom driver

WCID
A WCID device, where WCID stands for "Windows Compatible ID", is a USB device that provides extra information to a Windows system, in order to facilitate automated driver installation and, in most circumstances, allow immediate access. WCID allows a device to be used by a Windows application almost as soon as it is plugged in, as opposed to the usual scenario where a USB device that is neither HID nor Mass Storage requires end-users to perform a manual driver installation. As such, WCID can bring the 'Plug-and-Play' functionality of HID and Mass Storage to any USB device (that sports a WCID aware firmware).WCID is an extension of the WinUSB Device functionality.

Other solutions 
One solution is the use of a predefined USB device class. Operating systems provide built-in drivers for some of them. The most widely used device class for embedded devices is the USB communications device class (CDC). A CDC  device can appear as a virtual serial port to simplify the use of a new device for older applications.

Another solution is UsbDk. UsbDk supports all device types including isochronous and provides simpler way for device access acquisition that does not involve INF files creation and installation. UsbDk is open source, community supported and works on all Windows versions starting from Windows XP.

If the previous solutions are inappropriate, one can write a custom driver. For newer versions of Microsoft Windows, it can be done using the Windows Driver Foundation.

References 

  The newest version can be found at USB.org

Windows components